American R&B/soul singer Chaka Khan has released thirteen albums during her solo career. Her first solo single was "I'm Every Woman", also released in 1978. She has released a total of 46 solo singles throughout her career. Khan has placed four albums in the top twenty of the Billboard albums chart, scored one top 10 and four additional top-40 hits (three as a featured artist) on the Billboard Hot 100. On the Billboard R&B Songs chart, Khan hit the top 10 ten times (including three times as a featured artist) including five number ones (including two as a featured artist. On Billboards Dance Club Chart, Khan had six number ones and another number one as a featured artist. On the UK Singles Chart, she has scored three top 10s, eight additional top 40 singles (including five as a featured artist).

Chaka Khan also recorded as a member of R&B/funk band Rufus. Khan released her first studio album in 1978 while she was still the lead singer of Rufus. She would continue to release albums with the group off and on until its dissolution in 1983. On most Rufus releases, the artist name was listed as "Rufus featuring Chaka Khan" or "Rufus and Chaka Khan". (Rufus releases are not included in this discography.) Rufus hit the Hot 100 top 10 three times, the US Top R&B Songs chart top 10 twelve times including five number ones, Billboards Dance Club chart's top 10 four times including one number one. Rufus hit the UK top 40 with two versions of "Ain't Nobody", with both reaching the top 10.

Label associations
Khan spent the first 14 years of her solo career with Warner Bros. Records, where she released eight albums. She has also released albums for the Elektra, NPG, Earthsong, and Burgundy labels.

Albums

Studio albums

Compilation albums

Singles

As main performer

As featured performer

Other appearances

Singles (above) are excluded.

See also
Rufus (band)#Discography

Notes

References

External links

Discographies of American artists
Rhythm and blues discographies
Soul music discographies
Funk music discographies
Disco discographies